Havendale is a suburban, neighborhood located in Kingston, Jamaica.

References

Neighbourhoods in Kingston, Jamaica